Philadelphia City Hall is the seat of the municipal government of the City of Philadelphia. Built in the ornate Second Empire style, City Hall houses the chambers of the Philadelphia City Council and the offices of the Mayor of Philadelphia. It is also a courthouse, serving as the seat of the First Judicial District of Pennsylvania, and houses the Civil Trial and Orphans' Court Divisions of the Court of Common Pleas of Philadelphia County.

Built of brick, white marble, and limestone, Philadelphia City Hall is the world's largest free-standing masonry building and was the world's tallest habitable building upon its completion in 1894. In 1976, it was designated a National Historic Landmark, and in 2006, was also named a National Historic Civil Engineering Landmark by the American Society of Civil Engineers.

History and description

The building was designed by Scottish-born architect John McArthur Jr. and Thomas Ustick Walter in the Second Empire style, and was constructed from 1871 to 1901 at a cost of $24 million. City Hall's tower was completed by 1894, although the interior was not finished until 1901. Designed to be the world's tallest building, it was surpassed during construction by the Washington Monument and the Eiffel Tower. Upon completion of its tower in 1894, it became the world's tallest habitable building. It was also the first secular building to have this distinction, as all previous world's tallest buildings were religious structures, including European cathedrals and—for the previous 3,800 years—the Great Pyramid of Giza.

The location chosen was one of the five center city urban park squares dedicated by William Penn, that geometrically is the center to the other four squares within Center City renamed as Penn Square. The principal exterior materials are limestone, granite, and marble. The original design called for virtually no sculpture. The stonemason William Struthers and sculptor Alexander Milne Calder were responsible for the more than 250 sculptures, capturing artists, educators, and engineers who embodied American ideals and contributed to this country's genius. The final construction cost was $24 million.

At , including the statue of city founder William Penn atop its tower, City Hall was the tallest habitable building in the world from 1894 to 1908. It remained the tallest in Pennsylvania until it was surpassed in 1932 by the Gulf Tower in Pittsburgh; it is now the 16th tallest. It was the tallest in Philadelphia until 1986 when the construction of One Liberty Place surpassed it, ending the informal gentlemen's agreement that had limited the height of buildings in the city to no higher than the Penn statue.

It was constructed over the time span from 1871 to 1901 and includes 700 rooms dedicated for uses of various governmental operations. The building structure used over 88 million bricks and thousands of tons of marble and granite. With almost 700 rooms, City Hall is the largest municipal building in the United States and one of the largest in the world. The building houses three branches of government: the city's executive branch (the Mayor's Office), its legislature (the Philadelphia City Council), and a substantial portion of the judicial activity in the city (the Civil Division and Orphan's Court of the Pennsylvania Court of Common Pleas for the First Judicial District are housed there, as well as chambers for some criminal judges and some judges of the Philadelphia Municipal Court).

It was the tallest clock tower in the world when it was completed; it was surpassed by the Metropolitan Life Insurance Company Tower in 1912, and is currently the 5th tallest building of this type. The clock faces are larger in diameter than those on Big Ben which measure . City Hall's clock was designed by Warren Johnson and built in 1898. The 1937 Philadelphia Guide noted that "shortly after the clock was installed the city inaugurated a custom which still continues. Every evening at three minutes of nine the tower lights are turned off, and then turned on again on the hour. This enables those within observation distance, though unable to see the hands, to set their timepieces. There are four bronze eagles, each weighing three tons with  wingspans, perched above the tower's four clocks.

Once enclosed with chain-link fencing, the observation deck is now enclosed by glass. It is reached in a 6-person elevator whose glass panels allow visitors to see the interior of the iron superstructure that caps the tower and supports the statuary and clocks. Stairs within the tower are only used for emergency exit. The ornamentation of the tower has been simplified; the huge garlands that festooned the top panels of the tower were removed.

In the 1950s, the city council investigated tearing down City Hall for a new building elsewhere. They found that the demolition would have bankrupted the city due to the building's masonry construction.

Beginning in 1992, Philadelphia City Hall underwent a comprehensive exterior restoration, planned and supervised by the Historical Preservation Studio of Vitetta Architects & Engineers, headed by renowned historical preservation architect Hyman Myers. The majority of the restoration was completed by 2007, although some work has continued, including the installation of four new ornamental courtyard gates, based on an original architectural sketch, in December 2015.

The building was voted #21 on the American Institute of Architects' list of Americans' 150 favorite U.S. structures in 2007.

William Penn statue

The building is topped by a  bronze statue weighing  of city founder William Penn, one of 250 sculptures created by Alexander Milne Calder that adorn the building inside and out. The statue was cast at the Tacony Iron Works of Northeast Philadelphia and hoisted to the top of the tower in fourteen sections in 1894. The statue is the tallest atop any building in the world. Despite its lofty perch, the city has mandated that the statue be cleaned about every ten years to remove corrosion and reduce deterioration due to weathering, with the latest cleaning done in May 2017. Penn's statue is hollow, and a narrow access tunnel through it leads to a  hatch atop the hat.

Calder wished the statue to face south so that its face would be lit by the sun most of the day, the better to reveal the details of his work. The statue actually faces northeast, towards Penn Treaty Park in the Fishtown section of the city, which commemorates the site where Penn signed a treaty with the local Native American tribe. Pennsbury Manor, Penn's country home in Bucks County, is also located to the northeast.

By the terms of a gentlemen's agreement that forbade any structure from rising above the hat on the Penn statue, Philadelphia City Hall remained the tallest building in the city until it was surpassed by One Liberty Place in 1986. The abrogation of this agreement supposedly brought a curse onto local professional sports teams. Twice during the 1990s, the statue was partially clothed in a major league sports team's uniform when they were in contention for a championship: a Phillies cap in 1993 and a Flyers jersey in 1997—both teams lost. The supposed curse ended 22 years later when the Phillies won the 2008 World Series, a year and four months after a Penn statuette had been affixed to the final beam of the Comcast Center during its topping out ceremony in June 2007. Another Penn statuette was placed on the topmost beam of the Comcast Technology Center in November 2017, and the Eagles won the Super Bowl a few months later.

Centre Square 
City Hall is situated on land that was reserved as a public square upon the city's founding in 1682. Originally known as Centre Square—later renamed Penn Square—it was used for public gatherings until the construction of City Hall began in 1871. Centre Square was one of the five original squares of Philadelphia laid out on the city grid by William Penn. The square had been located at the geographic center of Penn's city plan, but the Act of Consolidation in 1854 created the much larger and coterminous city and county of Philadelphia. Though no longer at the exact center of the city, the square remains situated in the center of the historic area between the Delaware and Schuylkill rivers; an area which is now called Center City.

Penn had intended that Centre Square be the central focus point where the major public buildings would be located, including those for government, religion, and education, as well as the central marketplace. However, the Delaware riverfront would remain the de facto economic and social heart of the city for more than a century.

Film appearances 
City Hall has been a filming location for several motion pictures including Rocky (1976), Blow Out (1981), Trading Places (1983), Philadelphia (1993), 12 Monkeys (1995), National Treasure (2004), Transformers: Revenge of the Fallen (2009), and Limitless (2011).

Gallery

See also

List of tallest structures built before the 20th century
List of tallest buildings in Philadelphia
List of tallest buildings in Pennsylvania
List of tallest clock towers
Parliament Building, Quebec City - built at approximately the same time in the same style
National Register of Historic Places listings in Center City, Philadelphia
 List of state and county courthouses in Pennsylvania

Note
 The Council on Tall Buildings and Urban Habitat (an authority on the official height of tall buildings worldwide) provides the following criteria for defining the completion of a building: "topped out structurally and architecturally, fully-clad, and open for business, or at least partially occupiable." Philadelphia City Hall was occupied by the mayor beginning in 1889 and the Supreme Court of Pennsylvania beginning in 1891, and the building was topped out in 1894. City Hall was the tallest habitable building in the world until 1908 when surpassed by the Singer Building.

References
Notes

Further reading
Gurney, George, Sculpture of a City—Philadelphia's Treasures in Bronze and Stone, Fairmount Park Association, Walker Publishing Co., Inc., New York, NY, 1974.
Hayes, Margaret Calder, Three Alexander Calders: A Family Memoir by Margaret Calder Hayes, Paul S. Eriksson, publisher, Middlebury, Vermont, 1977.
Lewis, Michael J. "‘Silent, Weird, Beautiful’: Philadelphia City Hall," Nineteenth Century, vol. 11, nos. 3 and 4 (1992), pp. 13–21

External links

Official Hand Book, City Hall, Philadelphia – handbook by City Publishing Co. (1901)
Google Street View

Center City, Philadelphia
City and town halls in Pennsylvania
Courthouses in Pennsylvania
Clock towers in Pennsylvania
Former world's tallest buildings
Government buildings completed in 1901
Government of Philadelphia
Historic American Buildings Survey in Philadelphia
Market East, Philadelphia
National Historic Landmarks in Pennsylvania
Second Empire architecture in Pennsylvania
Skyscraper office buildings in Philadelphia
Terminating vistas in the United States
Thomas U. Walter buildings
1901 establishments in Pennsylvania
City and town halls on the National Register of Historic Places in Pennsylvania
Historic Civil Engineering Landmarks